Steven Kevi is a Papua New Guinean Olympic boxer. He represented his country in the featherweight division at the 1992 Summer Olympics. He lost his first bout against Rogério Dezorzi of Brazil.

1992 Olympic results
Below is the record of Steven Kevi, a featherweight boxer from Papua New guinea who competed at the 1992 Barcelona Olympics:

 Round of 32: lost to Rogério Dezorzi (Brazil) on points, 6-20

References

External links

1968 births
Living people
Papua New Guinean male boxers
Olympic boxers of Papua New Guinea
Boxers at the 1992 Summer Olympics
Boxers at the 1996 Summer Olympics
Commonwealth Games competitors for Papua New Guinea
Boxers at the 1994 Commonwealth Games
Featherweight boxers